Creaser's mud turtle (Kinosternon creaseri) is a species of mud turtle in the family Kinosternidae. The species is endemic to the Yucatán Peninsula in southeastern Mexico.

Geographic range
K. creaseri is found in the Mexican states of Campeche, Quintana Roo, and Yucatan.

Habitat
The preferred natural habitat of K. creaseri is ponds, both permanent and temporary, in forest, shrubland, and freshwater wetlands.

Behavior
K. creaseri aestivates most of the year, and is only active during the rainy season, which occurs in June through October.

Reproduction
K. creaseri is oviparous. Clutch size is one or two eggs, and each female lays more than one clutch per year. Sex of the hatchlings is determined by temperature.

Etymology
The specific name, creaseri, is in honor of American zoologist Edwin Phillip Creaser (1907–1981).

References

Further reading
Hartweg NE (1934). "Description of a new kinosternid from Yucatan". Occasional Papers of the Museum of Zoology, University of Michigan (277): 1–2. (Kinosternon creaseri, new species).

Kinosternon
Endemic reptiles of Mexico
Turtles of North America
Fauna of the Yucatán Peninsula
Natural history of Campeche
Natural history of Quintana Roo
Natural history of Yucatán
Near threatened biota of Mexico
Near threatened fauna of North America
Reptiles described in 1934
Taxa named by Norman Edouard Hartweg
Taxonomy articles created by Polbot